Crazy – Completely Mad is a 1973 West German comedy film directed by Franz Josef Gottlieb and starring Rudi Carrell, Cornelia Froboess, and Monika Lundi.

Plot
Robert lives comfortably in a big mansion and luxury, all financed by his rich uncle in Brazil whom he made believe he studied medicine, that he is a successful married doctor who runs his own hospital. For 20 years the lie had gone unnoticed to his uncle until he intends to visit his nephew in Germany. In an attempt to ward off his uncle's visit Robert claims to be busy with a famous science professor from the eastern European state of Bosnatia, but to no avail. Uncle Bill now wants to meet the professor too. Robert's friends, solicitor Alex and Elke organise some actors to play Robert's wife and the said professor respectively. Once the uncle arrives with his beautiful daughter Daila, who was rather unattractive as child, Robert immediately regrets having claimed he was married. But not only he has a  problem, Oskar the actor a.k.a the professor  has a much bigger problems with a sick Arabian sheikh needing medical help and even worse, the bosnatian secret service believing the professor has fled his country and attempt to return him back. A chaotic cat-and-mouse chase ensues.

Cast

References

Bibliography

External links 
 

1973 films
1973 comedy films
German comedy films
West German films
1970s German-language films
Films directed by Franz Josef Gottlieb
Films scored by Gerhard Heinz
Constantin Film films
1970s German films